Bollnäs GIF FF is a Swedish football club located in Bollnäs.

Background
Since their foundation Bollnäs GIF FF has participated in the upper and lower divisions of the Swedish football league system. The club played in Division 4 Hälsingland the season 2014 which is the sixth tier of Swedish football. The first place in the league promoted the team to Division 3 Södra Norrland season 2015. They play their home matches at the Sävstaås IP in Bollnäs.

Bollnäs GIF FF are affiliated to the Hälsinglands Fotbollförbund.

The Bollnäs GIF bandy team is highly successful.

Season to season

In their early history Bollnäs GIF competed in the following divisions:

In recent seasons Bollnäs GIF have competed in the following divisions:

Attendances

In recent seasons Bollnäs GIF FF have had the following average attendances:

Footnotes

External links
 Bollnäs GIF FF – Official website

Football clubs in Gävleborg County

sv:Bollnäs GIF